Local elections were held in Hungary on 13 October 2019. Mayors and assembly members were elected for a term of 5 years.

Electoral system 

 Mayors of towns, cities, the districts of Budapest and Budapest itself are directly elected in a one-round, first-past-the-post election.
 Assembly members of cities (at least 10 000 inhabitants) are elected via a mixed single vote system, mostly in electoral neighbourhoods with first-past-the-post, with a smaller number of seats being distributed as "compensation" mandates between lists of losing candidates.
 Assembly members of towns (below 10 000 inhabitants) are elected with a plurality-at-large voting, where the voter can vote for as many candidates as there are seats.
 Members of county assemblies are elected with party-list proportional representation using the D'Hondt method.

Budapest

Mayor 

Gergely Karácsony was elected mayor, defeating incumbent István Tarlós who had been in office since 2010.

Assembly 

The General Assembly of Budapest consists of the directly elected mayor, the mayors of the districts, and 9 members from party electoral lists.

The opposition bloc (Momentum–DK–MSZP–Dialogue–LMP) won a majority of 18 seats, with Fidesz–KDNP winning 13, and 2 seats going to independent politicians. This will be the first time Fidesz will not hold a majority in the assembly in over 15 years.

County assemblies 
Parties running in the county assembly elections are subject to a 5% threshold. An asterisk indicates a party with an absolute majority. The Fidesz–KDNP coalition won a majority in all assemblies holding elections.

Election results (%)

Distribution of seats

Major cities

Cities with county rights

Italics denote a mayor not running for reelection

In the 23 cities, 13 government-aligned or government-supported candidates won, with 10 going to opposition or opposition supported mayors. This is a sharp improvement for the opposition as they previously only occupied 3 of these mayorships.

In most of the cities, the assembly majority is composed of members aligned with the mayor, except:
 Nagykanizsa, with a Fidesz-KDNP mayor, and opposition majority
 Szekszárd, with a Fidesz-KDNP mayor, and opposition majority
 Szolnok, with a Fidesz-KDNP mayor, and opposition majority
 Tatabánya, with an opposition mayor, and no clear majority
In Békéscsaba, the mayor's civil organization together with Fidesz-KDNP members have a majority.

Detailed results

Italics means incumbent, bold means winner of the election.

Results 
In several major cities and districts of Budapest, the opposition took part in the election with joint candidates as some surveys said there were possibilities to gain a majority in local municipalities with a joint list.

Opposition parties achieved better results as compared to the 2014 Hungarian local elections. This was the first set of local elections with a joint list of opposition parties.

Notes

References

2019 in Hungarian politics
Hungary
Local elections in Hungary